Leonor F. Loree (April 23, 1858 – September 6, 1940) was an American civil engineer, lawyer, railroad executive, and founder of the American Newcomen Society.

He obtained a Bachelor of Science degree in 1877, a Master of Science in 1880, a Civil Engineering degree in 1896 and a Doctor of Law in 1917, all from Rutgers College. He also obtained a Doctor of Engineering degree from Rensselaer Polytechnic Institute in 1933. He was President of the Delaware & Hudson Railroad and had interests in Kansas City Southern, Baltimore and Ohio, New York Central, and the Rock Island Railroads. He was a Trustee at Rutgers University from 1909–1940 and was Chairman of the Rutgers Board of Trustees Committee on New Jersey College for Women (now Douglass College) until 1938. He was the donor of the New Jersey College for Women Athletic Field (Antilles Field). Rutgers has a building named after him, Leonor Fresnel Loree, erected in 1963 on the Douglass campus.

Accomplishments

In 1923, Loree was a principal founder of The Newcomen Society in North America, a learned society promoting engineering, technology and free enterprise.

In 1903, Loree, together with Frank PJ Patenall, received , for the upper quadrant semaphore,  which soon became the most widely used form of railroad lineside signal in North America.  Railroads continued to install them until the 1940s.

"This is a helluva way to run a railroad!"

In 1906 a committee of creditors asked Leonor to take charge of the Kansas City Southern Railroad.  At the time it was considered no more than "two streaks of rust, its engines lost steam, the men were disheartened and the stations were shacks."  After Mr. Loree gave his initial inspection, in a speech in front of the financial community, he ended his professional and technical description of the railroad line by stating, "This is a helluva way to run a railroad".  Within three years after accepting the chairmanship, Loree turned it into what they call a banner railroad of the Southwest.

Career
Baltimore and Ohio Railroad: president 1901 - 1904
Chicago, Rock Island and Pacific Railroad president - 1904
Kansas City Southern Railway: president 1918 - 1920
Missouri-Kansas-Texas Railroad: chairman 1926 - 1928
Delaware and Hudson Railroad: president 1907 - 1938

Published works
 Economy in railway operation-Engineering Magazine, Volume 9, 1895.

See also
List of railroad executives

References

External links
 Biographical Sketch

1858 births
1940 deaths
American civil engineers
American engineering writers
20th-century American railroad executives
Baltimore and Ohio Railroad people
Chicago, Rock Island and Pacific Railroad
Kansas City Southern Railway
Delaware and Hudson Railway
Rensselaer Polytechnic Institute alumni